Federal Medical Centre, Katsina is a federal government of Nigeria medical centre located in Katsina, Katsina State, Nigeria. The current chief medical director is Abdullahi Shugaba.

History 
Federal Medical Centre, Katsina was established in the mid-70s. The hospital was formerly known as General Hospital, Katsina.

CMD 
The current chief medical director is Abdullahi Shugaba.

References 

Hospitals in Nigeria